Encore! is a studio album by American country music artist Jeanne Pruett. It was released in November 1979 on IBC Records. Encore! was Pruett's fifth studio release in her recording career and was her first to be issued on an independent record label. It was also her first album in four years. The album contained ten tracks and included two singles that became major hits: "Back to Back" and "Temporarily Yours".

Background and content
Encore! was recorded in July 1979 at the Audio Media Studio, located in Nashville, Tennessee. The sessions were produced by Walter Haynes, Pruett's longtime record producer under Decca/MCA Records. At the time, Haynes was the A&R director for the IBC record company. Haynes helped Pruett secure a contract with IBC at the time and with her signing, she became the label's first artist to record an album. The album was a collection of ten tracks. Three of the album's tracks were co-written by Pruett herself. This included the final track, "Please Sing Satin Sheets for Me". The song was a spinoff of Pruett's 1973 signature tune, "Satin Sheets". Other Nashville songwriters were chosen for the project, including Sonny Throckmorton, who wrote four of the album's songs. Also included on the album was a cover of Hank Thompson's "The Wild Side of Life".

Release and reception
Encore! was released in November 1979 on IBC Records. With its release, it became Pruett's first studio album to be issued in four years and her fifth album release overall. It was originally issued as a vinyl LP, containing five songs on each side of the record. Encore! spent a total of 37 weeks on the Billboard Top Country Albums chart before peaking at number 18 in March 1980. With its Billboard appearance, it became Pruett's first charting album since 1975 and her second highest charting album of her recording career. Billboard magazine took notice of Pruett's return to the charts in their October 1979 issue. "It all added up to remarkable comeback by this personable start of IBC Records and the 'Grand Ole Opry'," writers commented.

Encore! produced three singles, two of which became major hits between 1979 and 1980. The single included was "Please Sing Satin Sheets for Me", which was first released in mid 1979. The song spent eight weeks on the Billboard Hot Country Singles before only reaching number 54 in September. "Back to Back" was released as the second single off the album in October 1979. It became Pruett's first top ten hit and first major hit since 1974, climbing to number six on the country chart in February 1980. "Temporarily Yours" was released as the album's third single in February 1980. It became her second major hit off the record and fourth top ten hit when it peaked at number five on the country songs chart in May 1980.

Track listing

Personnel
All credits are adapted from the liner notes of Encore!.

Musical personnel
 Joe Allen – bass
 Eddie Bayers – drums
 Dennis Burnside – piano
 Jerry Carrigan – drums
 Fred Carter Jr. – rhythm guitar
 Hubert Henry – bass
 Kieran Kane – guitar
 Shane Keischler – keyboards
 The Leah Jane Singers – background vocals
 Weldon Myrick – steel guitar
 Jeanne Pruett – lead vocals, harmony vocals
 Rafe Van Hoy – guitar
 Paul Worley – guitar

Technical personnel
 Dennis Carney – photography
 Walter Haynes – producer
 Joe Johnston – graphics
 Bill Justis – string arrangements
 Marshall Morgan – engineering

Charts

Weekly charts

Year-end charts

Release history

References

1979 albums
Jeanne Pruett albums